Slag (stylized as SLAG) is a strategy-oriented war game written by Stewart Eastman for the TRS-80 and published by Adventure International in 1980.

Gameplay
Slag is a multiplayer war game in which each player controls a nation and must destroy the industry of all other players. According to the game's promotional material, "diplomacy is the major factor; but, strategic end tactical planning and eye and hand coordination are very important".

Reception
J. Mishcon reviewed Slag in The Space Gamer No. 38. Mishcon commented that "All in all a well balanced game with a lot of very nice options, but a game that heavily depends on your hand-eye coordination to shoot down those missiles. Buy it only if you're really into coordination."

Reviews
80-U.S. - Volume IV Number 2 (1981-03)
Moves #57, p16

References

1980 video games
Adventure International games
TRS-80 games
TRS-80-only games
Video games developed in the United States